Iheringichthys syi, is a species of demersal catfish of the family Pimelodidae that is native to Upper Rio Paraná in Brazil.

Description
It grows to a length of 22.0 cm.

Dorsal profile strongly convex. Body brownish with creamy lower third of flanks. Brown spots irregularly distributed on flanks. A Very narrow horizontal line pale whitish, crossing flanks. Dorsum of head and cheeks light brown. Clearly distinguished by the presence of only fine serrations on the anterior pectoral-spine margin. It has shorter dorsal-fin rays and a relatively shorter postorbital length.

References

Pimelodidae
Catfish of South America
Fish described in 2012